The Declaration on the Establishment of the Authority of the People was brought into force on 2 March 1977 by the General People's Congress, under the auspices of Muammar Gaddafi, in the name of the Arab people of the Libyan Arab Jamahiriya. This amendment to the constitution of 1969 would remain in force until the adoption of the interim constitution on 3 August 2011.

External links
 Text of the People's Authority 

Defunct constitutions
Constitutions of Libya
History of Libya under Muammar Gaddafi
1977 documents